Vijay Khurana is an Australian radio announcer, best known for his work on 100.7 XFM and Triple J.

Radio career 

Starting at 100.7 XFM, he presented weekday breakfast, weekend afternoons, and the Drive show. Moving to Triple J in 2005, he hosted many shifts including the Mid-dawn shift during the week and fill-in shifts.

On 14 April 2007, Vijay started his role as weekend lunch presenter on Triple J (10am-2pm), replacing previous presenter Gaby Brown.

On 6 December 2007, Vijay Khurana was announced as weekday lunch presenter on Triple J (12-3pm), replacing previous presenter Linda Marigliano, who in turn replaced Robbie Buck on the weekday Drive show (3pm-5.30pm) alongside Scott Dooley (Dools).

Vijay finished his last day on Triple J on 25 February 2011.

TV career 

On 27 July 2007, Vijay made his debut appearance on TV, presenting jtv.

References

External links 
Vijay Khurana's page on the XFM website
Vijay Khurana's page on the Triple J website
Vijay's Triple J lunch website

Living people
Triple J announcers
Year of birth missing (living people)